Jasmina, sometimes Jasminka, as a feminine variant, and Jasmin, sometimes Jasminko, as a masculine variant, are given names used in Bosnia and Herzegovina, Croatia, Macedonia, Montenegro, Serbia, and Slovenia, and same as a given name Jasmine, which is the common form in German, Romance and English-speaking countries, although almost always as a feminine variation.

Origin
These given names, both feminine and masculine variation, refer to a flower of a genus of Jasmine shrub and vine in the olive family, whose taxon name ultimately derives etymologically from the Old Persian, Yasameen, used in Persian as given name Yasmin, but could originate from even earlier times and from further to the east, from Sanskrit, as the oldest in Proto-Indo-Iranian language branch of Proto-Indo-European language family, entering Persian through Avestan, and later spreading westward through Arabic and Latin.

Variants and spelling
In Serbo-Croatian, Slovenian and Macedonian, Jasmina (feminine), and Jasmin (masculine), is a common spelling, however, there are other variations of these names, such as: Jasminko for masculine, and Jasminka for feminine variation, and ways of spelling them, such as: Yasmin and Yasmina, etc. However, it's assumed that Jasmina and Jasmin variation are most popular with Bosnian Muslim population, while variation Jasminka and Jasminko with Serbian, Croatian and other former-Yugoslavs.

Usage
Notable people with the name include:

Female
Jasmina Cibic, a Slovenian performance, installation and film artist
Jasmina Đokić, Serbian painter
 Jasmin Darznik (born 1973), Iranian–American writer
Jasminka Domaš, writer, journalist and scientist
Jasmina Hostert (born 1982), Bosnian-German politician
 Jasmin Hutter (born 1978), Swiss politician
Jasmina Ilić (born 1985) Serbian professional basketball player
Jasmina Jankovic (born 1986) Bosnian-born Dutch team handball player
Jasmina Kajtazović (born 1991) Slovenian-born Bosnian tennis player 
Jasmina Keber (born 1988) Slovenian badminton player
Jasmina Mihajlović (born 1960) Serbian writer and literary critic
Jasmina Mukaetova (born 1981) Macedonian pop singer
 Jasmin Ouschan (born 1986), Austrian pool player 
Jasmina Perazić (born 1960) former Serbia n basketball player
 Jasmin Schornberg (born 1986), German canoeist
 Jasmin Schwiers (born 1982), German actress
Jasmina Suter (born 1995), Swiss alpine ski racer
Jasmina Tešanović (born 1954) Serbian feminist author and political activist
Jasmina Tinjić, Bosnian tennis player
 Jasmin Wagner (born 1980), German pop singer, actress and model
 Jasmin Wöhr (born 1980), German tennis player

Fictional characters
Jasminka Antonenko, fictional character in Little Witch Academia

Male
 Jasmin Burić (born 1987), Bosnian goalkeeper
 Jasmin Handanović (born 1978), Slovenian goalkeeper

Popular culture
Uses of the name in popular culture include Greek-German singer Leo Leandros' 1962 pop hit "Lebwohl, Jasmina!", and also Jasmina an album by Dado Polumenta. Ajde, ajde Jasmina is a song by Bosnian pop-singer Zdravko Čolić.

References

Bosnian feminine given names
Croatian feminine given names
Montenegrin feminine given names
Serbian feminine given names
Bosnian masculine given names
Croatian masculine given names
Montenegrin masculine given names
Serbian masculine given names